Sostiene Pereira (Pereira prétend in French, Afirma Pereira in Portugal and Páginas da revolução in Brazil)  is a 1995  Italian drama film directed by Roberto Faenza. It is based on Antonio Tabucchi's novel Sostiene Pereira.

Marcello Mastroianni won the David di Donatello as Best Actor.

Plot
In Lisbon, during the António de Oliveira Salazar's Estado Novo dictatorship, Pereira (Marcello Mastroianni), a journalist who works in the culture section of a newspaper, discovers the real dark side of the regime when he meets and helps an anti-fascist young man, Monteiro Rossi (Stefano Dionisi).

Cast
 Marcello Mastroianni - Pereira
 Joaquim de Almeida - Manuel
 Daniel Auteuil - Dr. Cardoso
 Stefano Dionisi - Monteiro Rossi
 Nicoletta Braschi - Marta
 Marthe Keller - Mrs. Delgado
 Teresa Madruga - Portiera
 Nicolau Breyner - Father António
 Filipe Ferrer - Silva
 João Grosso - Police Chief
 Mário Viegas - Newspaper Editor
 Manuela Cassola
 Fátima Marques
 Rui Otero
 Pedro Efe

References

External links 
 
 

1995 films
1990s Italian-language films
1990s Portuguese-language films
1990s political drama films
Films directed by Roberto Faenza
Films scored by Ennio Morricone
1995 drama films
1995 multilingual films
Italian multilingual films
Portuguese multilingual films
1990s Italian films